The following is a timeline of the history of the city of Acapulco de Juárez, Guerrero, Mexico.

Prior to 20th century

 1550
 Acapulco town established by Fernando de Santa Ana.
 Pedro Pacheco becomes mayor.
 1565 – October: Spanish galleon San Pedro of Andrés de Urdaneta arrives from the Philippines in the first ever eastward voyage across the Pacific.
 1570s – Hospital de Nuestra Señora de la Consolación built (approximate date).
 1576 – Epidemic outbreak.
 1597 – Spanish colonial bureau of accounts established.
 1614 – January: Japanese ship Mutsu Maru arrives; passengers include Hasekura Tsunenaga.
 1615
 Acapulco-Manila galleon trade begins.
 October: Dutch Joris van Spilbergen expedition passes through.
 1616 – Fort of San Diego built.
 1617 –  built.
 1624 – October: Fuerte de San Diego taken briefly by Dutch.
 1627 – Customs building constructed.
 1776 – 21 April: Earthquake.
 1783 – Fort of San Diego rebuilt.
 1799 – Town becomes a city: "Ciudad de los Reyes de Acapulco."
 1803 – March: German scientist Alexander von Humboldt visits Acapulco.
 1810–1811 – City besieged by forces of José María Morelos during the Mexican War of Independence.
 1813 – April: Siege of Acapulco (1813); Morelos in power.
 1814 – City burnt per order of Morelos.
 1852 – 1852 Acapulco Earthquake totally destroys the city

20th century

 1907 – April: Earthquake.
 1909 – 30 July:  earthquake.
 1919 – Workers Party of Acapulco founded.
 1930 – Population: 6,529.
 1949 –  (street) opens.
 1950s –  built.
 1954 – Cine Tropical opens (approximate date).
 1955 –  established.
 1958 – Roman Catholic diocese of Acapulco established.
 1959 – Jorge Joseph Piedra becomes mayor.
 1960 – Population: 49,149.
 1967 – Aéroport international général Juan N. Álvarez in operation.
 1969
  built.
 Novedades Acapulco newspaper in publication.
 Sister city relationship established with Manila, Philippines.
 1970 – Population: 174,378.
 1971 –  (chapel) opens.
 1973
  opens.
  formed.
 1975
 Unidad Deportiva Acapulco (athletic facility) and  built.
  established.
 1978
 Miss Universe 1978 Pageant is held at the Teotihuacan Forum of the Acapulco Convention Center
 1980 – Population: 301,902.
 1981
  (park) opens.
  built.
 1985 – Fictional telenovela Tú o nadie broadcast (set in Acapulco).
 1986 – Museo Histórico de Acapulco (museum) established.
 1987 – Rio Group meets in city.
 1988 –  built.
 1991 – Festival Acapulco begins.
 1992 –  established.
 1993 –  (Mexico City-Acapulco highway) begins operating.
 1995 – Population: 592,528.
 1997
 June: Acapulco Black Film Festival begins.
 October: Hurricane Pauline.
 1999 –  (museum) opens.
 2000 – Population: 620,656.

21st century

 2005 – June: Guerrero police chief killed.
 2008
 5 October:  held.
  tourist resort and its Forum de Mundo Imperial (stadium) open.
 La Isla Acapulco Shopping Village in business.
 2011 – 30 January:  held.
 5 May 2011: 2011 Guerrero earthquake
 2012
 24 March: Verónica Escobar Romo becomes mayor.
 1 July:  held; Luis Walton wins.
  (public transit) construction and  begin.
 2013 – September: Hurricane Manuel.
 2015 – Luis Uruñuela Fey becomes mayor.
 2018 - 7 May: Anti-crime clown protest.
 2021 - 17 September: 2021 Guerrero earthquake

See also
 Acapulco history
 History of Guerrero
 History of Guerrero state (in Spanish)
 List of mayors of Acapulco (municipality)

References

This article incorporates information from the Spanish Wikipedia.

Bibliography

in English
Published in 18th–19th centuries

 
 
 
 

Published in the 20th century
 
 
 
 
 
  (fulltext via OpenLibrary)
 

Published in the 21st century

in Spanish

External links

 Europeana. Items related to Acapulco, Mexico, various dates.
 Digital Public Library of America. Items related to Acapulco, Mexico, various dates

History of Guerrero
Acapulco
Acapulco